Samuel Grimshaw (March 2, 1840 - November 9, 1918) was an American soldier who fought in the American Civil War. Grimshaw received his country's highest award for bravery during combat, the Medal of Honor. Grimshaw's medal was won for his actions in Atlanta, Georgia, when he threw away a lit shell that had fallen near his company on August 6, 1864. He was honored with the award on April 5, 1894.

Grimshaw was born in Jefferson County, Ohio, entered service in Smithfield, Ohio, and was buried in Holton, Kansas.

Medal of Honor citation

See also
List of American Civil War Medal of Honor recipients: G–L

References

1840 births
1918 deaths
American Civil War recipients of the Medal of Honor
Burials in Kansas
People from Smithfield, Ohio
People of Ohio in the American Civil War
Union Army soldiers
United States Army Medal of Honor recipients